Nikolaes Heinsius may refer to:

 Nikolaes Heinsius the Elder (1620–1681), scholar and poet
 Nikolaes Heinsius the Younger (1655–1718), his son, novelist